The Genealogy Network Transfer Protocol (GNTP) is an unfinished protocol for a peer-to-peer genealogy network that was not completed because of resource constraints.  The idea was to allow genealogists to share GEDCOM files in much the same way that music and other files are distributed on other peer-to-peer networks.

Literature 
C. C. Albrecht, D. Dean, R. B. Jackson, S. W. Liddle, and R. D. Meservy. A Peer-To-Peer Network Protocol for Genealogical Data. In Proceedings of the First Family History Technology Workshop, pages 19–23, Provo, Utah, April 2001.
 - E-Business Center - Brigham Young University (Protocol Version 0.75)Last Updated: February 6, 2002 Conan Albrecht
A Peer-To-Peer Network Protocol for Genealogical Data - Conan C. Albrecht, Douglas Dean, Robert B. Jackson, Stephen W. Liddle, and Raymond D. Meservy (E-Business Center Marriott School of Management) Brigham Young University
Enabling the Distributed Family Tree - by Hilton Campbell

Archived Website on Wayback

References

See also
 growl (software)

Genealogy software
Internet protocols